The Communauté de communes du Pays de Coulommiers is a former communauté de communes in the Seine-et-Marne département and in the Île-de-France région of France. It was created in January 2013 by the merger of the former Communauté de communes de la Brie des Templiers and the Communauté de communes Avenir et développement du secteur des Trois Rivières. In January 2017 it was joined by the communes of the former Communauté de communes de la Brie des Moulins. It was merged into the new Communauté d'agglomération Coulommiers Pays de Brie in January 2018.

Composition
The communauté de communes consisted of the following 24 communes:

Amillis
Aulnoy
Beautheil
Boissy-le-Châtel
La Celle-sur-Morin
Chailly-en-Brie
Chauffry
Chevru
Coulommiers
Dagny
Dammartin-sur-Tigeaux
Faremoutiers
Giremoutiers
Guérard
Hautefeuille
Maisoncelles-en-Brie
Marolles-en-Brie
Mauperthuis
Mouroux
Pézarches
Pommeuse
Saint-Augustin
Saints 
Touquin

See also
Communes of the Seine-et-Marne department

References

Coulommiers